Trimark Pictures was an American production company that specialized in the production and distribution of television and home video motion pictures. The company was formed in 1984 by Mark Amin as Vidmark Entertainment with Vidmark Inc. (later Trimark Holdings Inc.) established as the holding company. As a small studio, Trimark produced and released theatrical, independent, television and home video motion pictures. The logo features a triangle with a profile of a tiger's head.

Among the company's many releases are Peter Jackson's 1992 film Dead Alive, which they chose to release theatrically due to Jackson's possessing a following. They are well known for releasing films considered to be controversial for the time period, as in the case with the 1999 film Better Than Chocolate, as some newspapers refused to carry advertisements for the film that featured the word "lesbian" as part of a critic blurb.

Background
Vidmark Entertainment was formed in August 1984 and began operating as a domestic home video distributor in early 1985. In April 1986, Vidmark Entertainment signed a deal with ABC Video Enterprises, to distribute six titles on videocassette. In 1987, Vidmark began distributing and sub-licensing motion pictures for international distribution. That year, the company entered theatrical distribution and production with the acquisition of four films and completion of its first in-house productions, namely American Gothic, That's Adequate, Silent Memory and Born of Fire. 

Vidmark Entertainment entered motion picture production in 1988 with the feature Demonwarp. 

Trimark picked up its first film, Warlock, a 1989 film starring Julian Sands which was a major theatrical hit with fans of such films. Trimark eventually made the sequel Warlock: The Armageddon in 1993. Trimark also saw success in other familiar film series the studio produced and distributed. Leprechaun, released in 1993 starring a young Jennifer Aniston and Warwick Davis as the sinister leprechaun grossed over $10 million during its theatrical run. One theatrical sequel and four direct to video sequels eventually followed. Other Trimark productions included The Dentist, a major hit on HBO, Return of the Living Dead III and Pinocchio's Revenge. Trimark also made the dramatic Eve's Bayou, starring Samuel L. Jackson, which received critical acclaim. Trimark also released the miniseries Storm of the Century on home video. On June 29, 1990, Vidmark Entertainment began trading on NASDAQ with the ticker symbol VDMK.

On December 31, 1991, Vidmark acquired International Broadcast Systems, Ltd. for $1.6 million and renamed the company as Trimark Television. In June 1992, Vidmark, Inc. changed its name to Trimark Holdings, Inc. to reflect Trimark's diversification of its distribution streams. In March 1993, the company formed Trimark Interactive to expand into the emerging market for
interactive software and multimedia. Trimark Interactive's assets were sold to Graphix Zone in March 1997.

In 2000, Trimark merged with Lions Gate Entertainment in which Amin became the single largest shareholder. In 2001, Mark Amin founded Sobini Films, and is its CEO.

In late 2017, Lionsgate launched a channel for Roku streaming players using the Vidmark name and a modified variant of their late 1980s logo, with Lionsgate-owned movies, including some from the original Vidmark and Trimark, amongst the selection.

List of distributed movies

Theatrical

Direct-to-video

References

1984 establishments in California
2000 disestablishments in California
2000 mergers and acquisitions
American companies established in 1984
American companies disestablished in 2000
Companies based in Santa Monica, California
Defunct American film studios
Entertainment companies based in California
Film production companies of the United States
Former Lionsgate subsidiaries
Mass media companies established in 1984
Mass media companies disestablished in 2000